Oxytricha is a genus of ciliates in the family Oxytrichidae.

Genomics 
The draft macronuclear genome of Oxytricha trifallax was published in 2013.

Species

References 

Spirotrichea
Ciliate genera